Clytie arenosa is a moth of the family Erebidae first described by Walter Rothschild in 1913. The nominate form is found in the deserts of North Africa. Subspecies Clytie arenosa nabataea is found in Israel (in oases in the Jordan Rift Valley)

There is one generation per year. Adults are on wing from April to June.

The larvae probably feed on Tamarix species.

Subspecies
Clytie arenosa arenosa
Clytie arenosa nabataea

External links

Image

Ophiusina
Moths described in 1913
Moths of Africa
Moths of the Middle East